Naim (also spelled Na'im, Nayeem, Naeem, Naiem, Nahim, Naheem, Nyhiem, Nihiem, Nyheim, Niheem, or Nahiem) is a male given name and surname. 

Notable persons with the name include: 
Naim ibn Hammad (died 843 AD), Hadith collector
Naeem Ahmed (born 1952), Pakistani cricketer
Na'im Akbar (born 1944), American psychologist
Naïm Aarab (born 1988), Belgian football player
Naim Araidi (1950–2015), Israeli writer
Naim Ateek (born 1937), Palestinian priest
Naim Attallah (born 1931), Palestinian businessman
Naeem Ashraf (born 1972), Pakistani cricketer
Naim Bey (1872–1934), Ottoman bureaucrat
Naeem Bokhari (born 1948), Pakistani television host and lawyer
Naim Dangoor (1914–2015), British businessman
Naim Farouqi (born 1960), Afghan detainee
Naim Frashëri (1846–1900), Albanian romantic poet
Naim Frashëri (actor) (1923–1975), Albanian actor
Naeem Hashmi (died 1976), Pakistani film actor
Na'im ibn Musa, Iraqi mathematician
Na'eem Jeenah (born 1965), South African political activist
Naeem Khan (born 1958), American fashion designer
Naïm Kattan (born 1928), Jewish Iraqi-born Canadian writer
Niam Kuchi (born 1940), Afghan detainee
Naim Krieziu (1918–2010), Albanian football player
Naim Maloku (born 1958), Kosovar politician
Naeem Murr (born 1965), British novelist
Naim Popal (born 1954), Afghan musician
Naeim Saadavi (born 1969), Iranian football player and coach
Naim Süleymanoğlu (1967–2017), Turkish weightlifter
Naim Talu (1919–1998), Turkish politician and Prime Minister
Naim Terbunja (born 1984), Swedish boxer
Naimuddin (1832-1907), Bengali writer and scholar
Naeem Patel (born 1989), Billionaire Entrepreneur and Philanthropist
Naim Name (born in 1991), Brazilian lawyer
Naeem Wardak. (born 1985), Afghan Taliban spokesperson

Persons with the surname 
Abdullahi Ahmed An-Na'im (born 1946), Sudanese lawyer and writer
Armon Ben-Naim (born 1990), Israeli football player
C. M. Naim (born 1936), American writer
Hussein Naeem (1987–2007), Lebanese football player
Mohammad Naeem (disambiguation), several people
Moisés Naím (born 1952), Venezuelan writer
Omar Naim (born 1977), Lebanese film director and screenwriter
Ra'anan Naim (born 1935), Israeli politician
Yael Naim (born 1978), Israeli singer
Yuval Naim (born 1967), Israeli former football player and manager
Yuval Naimy (born 1985), Israeli basketball player

Arabic-language surnames
Arabic masculine given names
Bosniak masculine given names
Hebrew masculine given names
Jewish surnames
Turkish masculine given names